Islamia College is located in the city of Warangal, India. It has given birth to several other educational institutions, such as L.B. College, Pothana College and Kaktiya Degree College that were originally started on its  campus.

History
Islamia College was founded by Syed Mohammed Hussaini Haji Saheb in 1889. Syed Mahmood son of founder also worked in different capacities. Nawab Jeevan Yar Jung was the first president of the institute. Former MLA Mirza Shukur Baig, advocate and a religious poet, served the institution as secretary. Mohammed Khaja Moinuddin Khaiser Advocate and Subordinate Judge Syed Ahmed Hussain have served as president and secretary respectively. Mohammed Abdul Khader Advocate took over the reins of management and has been attached to the institution for the past 50 years. Present president of society is Shaik Basheer Ahmed and secretary of the society is Pathan Chand Basha.

M.A. Rasheed Nawazi has contributed to the growth of the college by serving in various capacities for more than thirty years. He was an Islamic Scholar and a religious personality of Warangal district. He worked as a headmaster of Islamia School and the principal of the degree and junior college.

Since 1987, the writer Mohd Bahadur Ali has worked as principal of the college.

Present day
In 2006, the famous poet of Warangal Azeez Ahmed Ursi took charge as In charge principal. After Azeez Ahmed Ursi Commerce lecturer Gulam Mohiuddin took charge as In charge Principal. Anees Siddiqui served as vice principal for few years. In the year 2013 Dr Azeez Ahmed Ursi again took the charge of Regular Principal of the college. After retirement of Mr Gulam Mohiuddin Dr Meer Kawkab Ali took the charge of Principal in the year 2014.

Islamia Junior College
Islamia Junior College is a separate unit that runs under the leadership of Mohd Ateequddin. The former Junior College principal was Mahboob Ahmed Mahmoodi. M A Sultan Mahmoodi belongs to founders family. After retirement of Dr Ateequddin Mr Mohammed Abdul Qadeer took the charge of Principal in the Year 2015.  Pathan Chand Pasha holds the post of secretary of Degree College. The former vice-chancellor of Kakatiya University, Prof. T. Vasudev was a student of this institution. Recently the management of the college started Islamia Public School. It runs three faculties in only Urdu Medium. The college is recognized by the government, Kakatiya University and the University Grants Commission of India. The college is getting full aid from the government of Telangana and UGC.

See also 
Education in India
Literacy in India
List of institutions of higher education in Telangana

References

External links

Universities and colleges in Telangana
Education in Warangal
Educational institutions established in 1889
1889 establishments in British India
1889 establishments in India